is a town located in Tochigi Prefecture, Japan. ,  the town had an estimated population of 24,851 in 10,400 households, and a population density of 67 persons per km².

Geography
Nasu is located in the mountainous far northeast of Tochigi Prefecture. The Naka River runs through the southwestern portion of the town and the Kurokawa River through the northeast.

Surrounding municipalities
Tochigi Prefecture
 Ōtawara
 Nasushiobara
Fukushima Prefecture
 Shirakawa
 Tanagura
 Nishigō

Climate
Nasu has a Humid continental climate (Köppen Dfb) characterized by warm summers and cold winters with heavy snowfall.

Demographics
Per Japanese census data, the population of Nasu has declined slowly over the past 70 years, with a small uptick around the year 2000.

History
Nasu and Iouno villages and Ashino Town were created within Nasu District on April 1, 1889 with the creation of the modern municipalities system. The three municipalities merged to form Nasu Town on November 3, 1954.

Nasu Imperial Villa was built in 1926.

In March 2017 an avalanche killed 8 people.

Government
Nasu has a mayor-council form of government with a directly elected mayor and a unicameral town council of 13 members. Nasu, together with the city of Nasushiobara collectively contributes four members to the Tochigi Prefectural Assembly. In terms of national politics, the town is part of Tochigi 3rd district of the lower house of the Diet of Japan.

Economy
The economy of Nasu is heavily dependent on tourism from its numerous hot spring and ski resorts.

Education
Nasu has six public primary schools and two public middle schools operated by the town government. The town has one public high school operated by the Tochigi Prefectural Board of Education. There is also one private school including junior and high school.

Transportation

Railway
 JR East – Tōhoku Main Line (Utsunomiya Line)
 -   -

Highway
  – Nasu Interchange, Nasu Kogen Service Area and Smart Interchange

Local attractions
 Nasu Imperial Villa

Nasu Onsen, the collective name given to the various hot springs in the Nasu area surrounding Mt. Chausu. The eight hot springs in this area with accommodation and bathing facilities are sometimes referred to as Nasu Hachiyu (Shika no yu, sandogoya onsen, ōmaru onsen, kita onsen, benten onsen, takao onsen, yahata onsen, shin nasu onsen) 
Ashio Onsen
Sessho-seki
Mount Nasu
Nasu Animal Kingdom
Mount Jeans Nasu Ski Resort, a ski resort to the far north of Nasu
, an amusement facility based around the rindō lake, with activities such as a zip-line, boat ride, go-karts, and more.
 Cannabis Museum

References

External links

Official Website 

Towns in Tochigi Prefecture
Nasu, Tochigi